Mikael Pernfors defeated Todd Martin in the final, 2–6, 6–2, 7–5 to win the men's singles tennis title at the 1993 Canadian Open.

Andre Agassi was the defending champion, but lost in the quarterfinals to Todd Martin.

Seeds

Draw

Finals

Top half

Section 1

Section 2

Section 3

Section 4

External links
 1993 Canadian Open draw

1993 ATP Tour